Jorge Madrazo Cuéllar is the former Attorney General of Mexico. He served under the government of Ernesto Zedillo.

As of 2011 he directs the radio station KDNA in the United States.

References

Living people
Presidents of the National Human Rights Commission (Mexico)
Year of birth missing (living people)
Attorneys general of Mexico